Titular Patriarch(ate) of Alexandria may refer to the following Catholic patriarchal titles without residential see as such :  

 Latin Titular Patriarch of Alexandria
 Melkite Titular Patriarch of Alexandria, informally Alexandria of the Melkites, a title vested in the Melkite Patriarch of Antioch, like Melkite Titular Patriarch of Jerusalem